Claudio Maurizio Casanova (21 October 1895 – 20 April 1916) was an Italian professional footballer who played as a defender.

International career
Casanova made his only appearance for the Italy national football team on 17 May 1914 in a game against Switzerland.

Death
Casanova died from the injuries he suffered at the front in World War I.

External links

1895 births
1916 deaths
Italian military personnel killed in World War I
Italian footballers
Italy international footballers
Genoa C.F.C. players
Association football defenders